The Liberal Democratic Party (abbrev: LDP) is a Chinese political party founded in the town of Tawau, Sabah, Malaysia by Hiew Min Kong in 1989.

The party is considered a minor political party in Malaysia, having its base mainly in Sabah. It was allocated one parliamentary seat under the Barisan Nasional (BN) political alliance, the Sandakan seat. The seat, which was won by the party's then president Liew Vui Keong in the 2008 general election, was lost in the 2013 general election to a candidate from the Democratic Action Party (DAP). As a result, the party is currently represented in neither the Dewan Rakyat nor the Sabah State Legislative Assembly. On 11 May 2018, Liberal Democratic Party announced that they had decided to leave the BN coalition with immediate effect. On 28 March 2021, its supreme council endorsed its application to join the ruling Perikatan Nasional (PN) coalition. However, on 2 October 2021, PN Chairman and former Prime Minister Muhyiddin Yassin rejected application of the party.

History 
The Liberal Democratic Party was formed in 1989 during the era when Parti Bersatu Sabah (PBS), then a federal opposition party, was the state government of Sabah. The formation of LDP then was seen more as "a storm in a teacup" as the existence of Sabah People's United Front (BERJAYA), United Sabah National Organisation (USNO) and the Sabah Chinese Party (SCP) had posed a larger challenge to the mighty PBS then as LDP was a small party.

LDP contested the 1990 Sabah State Election and fielded 14 candidates but lost all the seats it contested. PBS won 44 seats out of the 48 State Constituencies it contested in the election. Despite LDP's defeat in the 1990 State Election, in 1991, LDP was admitted into the fold of BN as its first Chinese-based political party in Sabah. Chong Kah Kiat became the president then and had since replaced Pro tem President Hiew Ming Kong as the President of LDP.

As the United Malay National Organisation (UMNO) was introduced into Sabah to fight PBS, other BN political parties in Sabah who had contested in the 1990 State Election like BERJAYA and USNO were forced to disband and disappeared from the political scene altogether. Under the Barisan ticket, LDP was allocated three seats, Tenom, Kudat and Sembulan. LDP's candidate won the Kudat seat while lost the other two to the PBS's candidate. The aftermath of the 1994 State Election saw many state elected representatives switching their political parties. This resulted in the collapse of PBS and the emergence of Sabah UMNO which went on to form the next government. The new State Government of Sabah included LDP's sole representative, Kong Hong Ming, into the Sabah Cabinet. In 1995, LDP president Chong Kah Kiat was picked as a senator to the Dewan Negara. However, later, Chong was challenged for the presidency by Kong. Chong eventually emerged as the winner and Kong left the LDP, quitting his ministerial post from the Sabah cabinet.

Chong continued as a Federal Minister in the Prime Minister's Department from 1995 till 1999 when he resigned to return to state politics. LDP was allocated two State Constituencies seats for the 1999 State Election namely Kudat and Karamunting where the candidates are Wong Lien Tat, the Party's vice-president and Chong himself. They eventually won both seats handsomely. Both were made ministers in the state cabinet.

LDP reached its political peak when Chong became the 13th Chief Minister of Sabah under the Rotation System introduced by the then Prime Minister of Malaysia, Mahathir Mohamad in 2001. Chong Kah Kiat became Chief Minister for two years till 2003 before the post went back to UMNO and the post was never again rotated as in the 2004 Sabah state election, BN swept 59 out of the 60 state seats. LDP won all the three state seats it was allocated under the BN ticket. Despite this, LDP lost the Sandakan parliamentary seat to an independent candidate who had the backing of Sabah Progressive Party (SAPP). In 2005, Liew Vui Keong was appointed as the party's Secretary General.

In 2006, Chong Kah Kiat decided to retire as party president. Liew Vui Keong and Chin Su Phin then took over as the Party President and Deputy President posts respectively. Teo Chee Kang was appointed Secretary General. Chong Kah Kiat, however, did not retire from politics as he remained as the State's Deputy Chief Minister cum Minister of Tourism, Culture and Environment. On 13 April 2007, Chong Kah Kiat resigned from the State Cabinet due to his differences with the Chief Minister Musa Aman over the State Government's stoppage order for the construction of a Mazu statue which was undertaken by the Kudat Thean Hou Charitable Foundation in Kudat. Chong resignation from the state cabinet completes his exit in politics.

In the 2008 Sabah state election, all new faces were fielded in the three state seats allocated to LDP. LDP won all three seats comfortably as BN swept 61 seats out of the 62 state seats. Secretary general Teo Chee Kang won the Tanjong Kapor seat which was previously held by Chong Kah Kiat. New LDP President Liew Vui Keong also won the Sandakan Parliamentary seat and was subsequently appointed Deputy Minister of Trade and Industries. After the SAPP announced it would quit BN on 17 September 2008, its quota of Sabah's Deputy Chief Minister was handed over to LDP. Deputy President Chin Su Phin suggested that the party's three assemblymen were too young-and-inexperienced and therefore not ready to take up such a senior position and instead recommended Malaysian Chinese Association (MCA) for the post citing that it is the largest Chinese-based BN component party. In spite of that, first term assemblyman Peter Pang was appointed to the post by the Chief Minister Musa. Pang was chosen because compared to the other two LDP assemblymen, Teo Chee Kang (Tanjung Kapor) and Pang Yuk Ming (Merotai), Pang is not closely aligned to Chong Kah Kiat. In September 2010, LDP lost its representation in the state cabinet when Peter Pang left the LDP. In March 2011, Peter Pang applied to join Parti Gerakan Rakyat Malaysia (GERAKAN). Peter Pang was later stripped off his position as Deputy Chief Minister, with the position eventually going to senior state assemblyman Yee Moh Chai of the PBS. Few days after the 2018 general election, the party left the defeated BN coalition.

Leadership

Presidents 

1989–1991 ; 2 years: Hiew Min Kong
 1991–2006 ; 15 years: Chong Kah Kiat
 2006–2014 ; 8 years: Liew Vui Keong
 2014–2018 ; 4 years: Teo Chee Kang
 2018-present ; 2 years (as of 2020): Chin Su Phin

Supreme Council (2021-2024)

 President:
 Chin Su Phin
 Deputy President:
 Yong Wui Chung
 Vice President:
 Ng Tet Hau
 Peter Chin Kee Yong
 David Ong Choon Chung
 Chong Thien Ming
 Wong Min Kong
 Thien Kui Sang
 Sim Fui
 Youth Chief:
 Jimmy Lai Khin Hiong
 Women's Chief:
 Wong Kuen Yin
 Secretary-General:
 Chin Shu Ying
 Deputy Secretary-General:
 Chin Soon Ho
 Treasurer-General:
 John Lee Tsun Vui
 Deputy Treasurer-General:
 Chin Kiang Ming
 Chief Publicity Officer:
 Simon Chin Hock Siong
 Organising Secretary:
 Goh Soo Yee
 Speaker:
 Edward Wong Kon Fan
 Deputy Speaker:
 Mok Cheh Hung

 Committee Members:
 Shim Nyat Yun
 Yii Ming Seng
 Eric Lau kah Hon
 Ng Kwan Loong
 Shim Tshin Choo
 Jason Liew Chien Yan
 Lam Jin Dak
 Steven Chung Kiam Fui
 Wong Chung On
 Chong Nyuk Fong
 Yong Khim Vun
 Alvin Saw Eng Seng
 Jimmy Lai Khin Hiong
 Max Voo Min Chung
 Fung Thau Chim
 Michelle Lee Cheng Wen
 Edward Wong Kon Fan
 Mok Cheh Hung @ Mok Kiong
 Jin Tze Vun
 Jacky Wong Kwan How
 Chin Vun Pheaw
 Lim Chin Siong
 Nicholas Ban Wai Tzhing

General election results

State election results

References

External links 
 Official website

 
Political parties in Sabah
1989 establishments in Malaysia
Political parties established in 1989